The Ovens and Murray Football Netball League (O&MFNL) is an Australian rules football and netball competition containing ten clubs based in north-eastern Victoria, the southern Riverina region of New South Wales and the Ovens and Murray area. The name comes from the Ovens River, the river in the part of north-eastern Victoria covered by the league, and the Murray River, which separates Victoria and New South Wales.

The league features three grades in the Australian rules football competition, with these being First-Grade, Reserve-Grade and Under 18s. In the netball competition, there are four grades, with these being A-Grade, B-Grade, C-Grade and Under 16s.

Currently a home and away season consisting of eighteen rounds is played. The best five teams then play off according to the McIntyre system, culminating in the O&MFNL Grand Final, which from 1995 to 2017 was held at the Lavington Sports Ground in the Albury suburb of Hamilton Valley.

History

Beginnings of the O&MFA
Organised competition in the area started as the "Ovens & Murray Football Association" in 1893, with the following foundation clubs – Beechworth Wanderers, Chiltern, Eldorado, Rutherglen, Wangaratta City and Wangaratta West End,  with Beechworth Football Club winning premierships in 1893 and 1894 and Rutherglen winning thirteen O&MFA flags between 1895 and 1915.

In 1910, the O&MFA had only three teams – Albury, Excelsior and Rutherglen with Rutherglen winning the premiership.

Then in 1911, both Excelsior and Rutherglen applied to enter the Rutherglen and District Football Association. As a result, the O&MFL folded, with local teams attempting to apply to play in the Rutherglen & DFA. A ballot took place at a Rutherglen & DFA meeting on 29 April at Mackay's Hotel, Rutherglen which resulted in Balldale, North Albury, Rutherglen, South Albury and Wodonga being refused admission to join the association. Corowa, Excelsior and Lake Rovers were club's that were admitted. In 1911, the Albury Football Club was planning to divide the club into South Albury and North Albury teams, but as they were not admitted into the Rutherglen & DFA, the club went into recess in 1911. Rutherglen FC also went into recess in 1911.

Albury FC and Rutherglen FC were admitted into the Rutherglen & DFA in 1912.

In 1913, the Rutherglen & DFA consisting of the following teams – Albury, Balldale, Border United, Howlong, Lake Rovers and Rutherglen, with Albury defeating Rutherglen in the grand final at the Albury Sportground.

The competition reformed under the Ovens & Murray Football Association banner again in 1914, involving the following five teams: Albury, Border United, Howlong, Lake Rovers and Rutherglen. Balldale FC entered the Coreen & District Football League in 1914.

In 1915, Beechworth Football Club and Wangaratta Football Club returned to play in the O&MFA. Howlong Football Club entered the Chiltern & District Football Association and went onto win the premiership, while Rutherglen defeated Lake Rovers in the O&MFA grand final played at Rutherglen.

After a three-year break due to World War I, the O&MFA reformed for the 1919 season with only four clubs, Border United Football Club (Corowa based), Howlong, Lake Rovers and Rutherglen. Albury Football Club was reformed in early 1919 and played in the Albury Senior Football Association with two teams – South Albury and North Albury, with St. Patrick's FC defeating South Albury Football Club in the grand final on the Albury Sportsground.

In 1920 the O&MFA didn't reform; "It seems strange that the O&MFA has apparently been allowed to die a natural death" with only two club's present at the O&MFA – AGM., with some clubs moving to play in the Chiltern & DFA and Coreen & DFA.

The competition reformed in 1921 with Lakes Rovers, Rutherglen, St Patricks, Corowa, Springhurst and Wahgunyah. In 1922, larger town clubs Benalla and Wangaratta joined the OMFA whilst Wahgunyah and Springhurst moved to the Chiltern DFL.

In 1924, Lake Rovers Football Club amalgamated with the Rutherglen Football Club. and Albury FC and the Diggers FC also decided to amalgamate in 1924 and apply for admission into the Ovens and Murray Football League as Albury Football Club.

In 1926, the O&M name was changed from an association to a league, its present form. Around this time the clubs contesting the league included Wangaratta, Hume Weir (which drew many of its players from workers constructing the Hume Dam at the time), Yarrawonga and two clubs from the town of Albury, St Patricks and Albury club). These two clubs were largely divided amongst sectarian lines, St Patricks being Roman Catholic and Albury being Protestant and, after much tension, in 1929 the two clubs agreed to disband and form two new clubs, East Albury Football Club and West Albury Football Club, with the player base to be drawn geographically.

In 1930, Haydn Bunton was recruited from the West Albury Football Club by Victoria Football League (VFL) club Fitzroy, where he became regarded as one of the best VFL players in the Depression-era and would go on to win three Brownlow Medals. Bunton Park, where North Albury Football Club is based, was not named after Haydn, but rather his brother Cleaver Bunton, who was elected president of the O&MFL in 1930 and would serve in that role until 1969. (Cleaver would also later serve as mayor of Albury for 30 years.)

In 1930 Hume Weir Football Club and Ebden Rovers Football Club merged to become the Weir United Football Club.

East Albury Football Club and Weir United Football Club merged in 1933 to become the Border United Football Club (Albury based) and wore green and white jumpers. In 1933 West Albury Football Club changed its name to the Albury Football Club and remained in the West Albury colours of maroon and blue.

At the O&MFA's 1936 Annual General Meeting, it was announced that the Border United FC would merge with the Albury Football Club as both clubs were in debt and also due to a lack of players. The newly merged team took on the name of the Albury Football Club. This left the City of Albury with only one football team.

Post-World War II
In 1940, the league went into recess after round 10 for the duration of World War II, before full competition resumed in 1946. In 1945, Rutherglen, played in the Chiltern & District Football Association and Wodonga played in the Albury Border Football Association in 1945. In 1947 North Albury was admitted, followed by Wangaratta Rovers and Myrtleford, who were admitted from the Ovens & King Football League in 1950. Wangaratta won four consecutive premierships between 1949 and 1953, under captain coach, Mac Holten.

The Wangaratta Rovers would go on to dominate the O&M for the remainder of the 20th Century, winning fifteen premierships to date, a number only recently overhauled by Albury with their own streak of flags.

Throughout the 1950s and 1960s the league began to gain a reputation within Victoria as being the strongest competition outside the then VFL and VFA. The best players were often recruited from the O&M to play for one of the "city" clubs, but it was not uncommon for a VFL player to retire from the "big" league and play in the O&M or another country league, and perhaps start a coaching career there as well, often at the same time as a playing coach. One notable example of this, as far as the O&M was concerned, was Bob Rose, who left Collingwood as a player in 1955 and became captain coach of the Wangaratta Rovers and lead them to two premierships in 1958 and 1960, after which he returned to Collingwood to continue his coaching career.

1970s and 1980s
In 1968, the VFL introduced country recruitment zones throughout Victoria and Riverina, which limited the areas from which each VFL club could recruit. The O&MFL was allocated to North Melbourne, and thus quite a few of the better players from the O&M came to play for the Kangaroos, contributing in part to that club's rise to success in the 1970s. These included Mick Nolan, Xavier Tanner, Gary Cowton, Peter Chisnall and John Byrne and later John Longmire, who had a good season with Corowa-Rutherglen as a goal kicking forward in O&M seniors in 1987. The zoning system was discontinued in the late 1980s as the VFL/AFL introduced a draft system.

The Wangaratta Rovers dominated the 1970's, playing in ten grand finals between 1970 and 1980, winning seven premierships and finishing third in 1973.

In 1974 the O&MFL was disaffiliated by the Victorian Country Football League (VCFL) when the O&MFL refused to accept an application from the Lavington Football Club to join the league. By this stage the football club was based at the Lavington Sports Club, an established licensed club, and was strong enough to field teams in both the Tallangatta League and Hume Football League the following year.

The makeup of the competition remained stable until 1979, when Corowa and Rutherglen merged into Corowa-Rutherglen, and the Lavington Football Club was finally admitted from the Farrer Football League, so the number of clubs remained at ten.

Lavington's home ground, the Lavington Sports Club Oval, provided an ideal venue for many sports as the sports club gradually developed it after its construction in the 1970s. The league has designated it as the venue for most of the league's grand finals since the 1980s. Recently, added assistance for the staging of the grand final through regional promotion and in-kind sponsorship has been provided by the Albury City Council.

In 1983, after an unsuccessful debut season playing for Hawthorn the previous year, Gary Ablett played for Myrtleford in the O&M for a year, before he was recruited by Geelong where he recommenced his career in the VFL/AFL and established himself as one of the code's best players, being inducted into the Australian Football Hall of Fame in 2005.

By the late 1980s, the Wodonga Demons of the Tallangatta League had made a number of bids to join the O&M, and in 1989 were accepted into the competition to serve the west of the city of Wodonga, based at Birralee Park. They changed their name to the Wodonga Raiders Football Club so as to not cause confusion with the Benalla Demons and the long established Wodonga Football Club.

The 1990 Bloodbath Grand Final
Shortly after the commencement of the 1990 grand final between Wodonga and Lavington, played at the Albury Sportsground, most of the players of the two teams became involved in a bench-clearing brawl. As the game was televised by a local TV station, the footage received sensationalistic national media coverage where the brawl was generally described as a shocking indictment on the code. Even though over a decade had elapsed, comparisons to this incident were made after the 2004 AFL Cairns Grand Final descended into a similar fracas.

Wodonga eventually won the match by 20 points and thus the premiership, and the league tribunal handed out a number of lengthy suspensions to players from both sides for the following season. Incidentally, the result marked the second premiership for Wodonga's coach of that time, Jeff Gieschen, his first for the club being in 1987, before he went on to coach West Perth and then a stint at Richmond in 1997–1999.

Recent years
In 1998, after a string of unsuccessful seasons in the O&M, Benalla moved to the Goulburn Valley Football League. In 2000 the Penrith Panthers Leagues Club, financiers of the Penrith Panthers National Rugby League team, merged with the Lavington Sports Club. As a result, the Lavington Football Club changed their nickname from the Blues to the Panthers, added "Panthers" to their title, and adopted a guernsey in the same colours as the NRL Panthers, but in the Port Adelaide AFL pattern.

Also around this time, the Wagga Tigers Football Club, which had dominated the Riverina Football League, made a bid to join the O&MFL; however, partially due to concerns from the league's southern clubs about travel times, the bid was rejected. The Wagga Tigers then successfully bid to join the AFL Canberra.

In 2000 the O&MFL, in an association with the AFL North Melbourne Football Club, fielded a team in the Victorian Football League called the Murray Kangaroos, playing home games between Coburg and Lavington. However, due to concerns from O&M clubs about player availability, the Kangaroos about travel time, and poor attendances compared with O&M league games, the venture was discontinued after three seasons and the Kangaroos subsequently set up an affiliation with the established VFL club Port Melbourne.

Current finals system
Since 1972 the OMFL has used the "McIntyre system". The final series is played over four weekends, with the grand final traditionally being played on the third weekend of September. Also normally there is no home ground advantage is awarded any teams, instead the O&M board deems where the finals will be held, with all finals for both Football & Netball are played at the one venue during each final day. The  Grand Final  since 1995 has been held at Lavington Sports Ground (formally "Lavington Panthers Oval") in the Albury suburb of Hamilton Valley.

Clubs

Current clubs

Former clubs 

Notes

The club monikers listed above for former clubs are the ones they currently use and may not be their monikers used when playing in the Ovens and Murray league.

Club Mergers
 1877: Corowa FC & Wahgunyah FC merged between 1877 & 1905, then 1914 & 1919, and 1944 & 1947 and were known as Border United FC (Corowa based).
 1907: Lake Moodemere and Rutherglen FC merged just prior to the start of the 1907 O&MFA season and were then known as Rutherglen FC.
 1924: Albury FC and the Diggers FC merge and apply for admission into the Ovens and Murray Football League as Albury FC.
 1924: Lake Rovers Football Club amalgamated with the Rutherglen Football Club and be known as Rutherglen FC.
 1929: Benalla FC and Benalla Rovers FC merged to become Benalla Rovers FC, before changing back to Benalla FC in 1931.
 1930: Hume Weir Football Club and Ebden Rovers Football Club merged to become the Weir United Football Club.
 1930: Wangaratta FC (O&MFL) and Wangaratta Rovers FC (O&KFL) merged in 1930 and entered one team in the O&MFL & another team in the O&KFL. Wangaratta Rovers reformed as a stand alone club in 1945 and entered a team in the O&KFL, before joining the O&MFL in 1950.
 1933: East Albury Football Club and Weir United Football Club merge to become the Border United Football Club (Albury based) and wore green and white jumpers.
 1933: West Albury Football Club changed its name to the Albury Football Club and remained in the West Albury colours of maroon and blue.
 1936: Border United FC would merge with the Albury Football Club and be known as Albury FC.
 1979: Corowa FC and Rutherglen FC merge to become Corowa / Rutherglen FC.

Awards

Football: Seniors Best and fairest

Football: Reserves Best and Fairest
The Reserves Leo Burke Medal is awarded for the best and fairest seconds football player in the O&MFL during the home and away season. This award was originally called the Ralph Marks Award from 1953 to 1963. Marks was a former president of North Albury and an O&MFL official. Marks was the O&MFL Secretary from 1970 to 1975. This award was then called the Les Cuddon Award from 1964 to 1975, who was an O&MFL official from Rutherglen. Leo Burke from Burke's Hotel, Yarrawonga then took over as the award donor in 1975.

 - 1954 - K Teakle won on a countback. Aitken & Purss, both polled 9 votes in this award, but lost on a count back and have never received a retrospective medal like others have in the Morris Medal.
 - 1957 - Norm Hawking (Rutherglen) also won the 1951 O&MFL Morris Medal too.
 - 1968 - Norm Hogan won on a countback. Alan Benton lost on a count back and has never received a retrospective medal like others have in the Morris Medal.
 - 1969 - Alan Daniel won on a countback. Flower lost on a count back and has never received a retrospective medal like others have in the Morris Medal.
 - 1971 winner, Terry Burgess & 1996 winner, Scott Burgess are father and son.
 - 2013 - Ben Dower - Albury was ineligible to win after being suspended during the home and away series.
 - 2022 - Xavier Leslie (Yarrawonga) also won the 2013 O&MFNL Morris Medal too.

Football: Under 18 / Thirds Best and Fairest
The Thirds / Under 18 competition commenced in 1973 and the Leo Dean Medal is awarded for the best and fairest thirds football player in the O&MFL during the home and away season. This award was originally called the 3NE Award for the Thirds competition inaugural year in 1973 to 1984.

Leo Andrew Dean was a talented young former Wangaratta player who tragically died on Monday, 3 September 1984, at 20 years of age and this award is in memory of him.

 1983 - Rod Brewster (Benalla) won on a countback.  Michael Moore (Myrtleford) lost on a count back and has never received a retrospective medal like others have in the Morris Medal.
 1985 - John Pulling (Corowa Rutherglen) won on a countback. Paul Greaves (Benalla) lost on a count back and has never received a retrospective medal like others have in the Morris Medal.
 1989 - Daine Hochfeld (Wangaratta Rovers) polled the most votes, but was deemed ineligible due to a two week suspension for abusive language during the home and away series.
 1991 - Craig McBrien (Lavington) polled 13 x three votes.
 1998 - Myrtleford brothers, Greg, Mark and Justin Knobel have all won a O&MFNL Thirds best and fairest award.

Leading Football Goal Kicker

Most times leading goalkickers
 7 – Steve Norman – Wangaratta Rovers
 6 – Stan Sargeant – North Albury
 4 – Chris Stuhldreier – Lavington

Most centuries of goals kicked
 3 – Steve Norman – Wangaratta Rovers
 3 – Chris Stuhldreier – Lavington

Most career goals kicked
 1096 – Stan Sargeant; 289 games; 3.79 goals per game. North Albury
 1016 – Steve Norman; 242 games; 4.19 goals per game. Wangaratta Rovers

O&MFL Grand Final – Best on ground

O&MFNL - Rising Star of the Year
The O&MFNL Rookie of the Year was first awarded in 1987.
Rookie of the Year 1987 to 1997
The Richard Hamilton Award (Rising Star of the Year)

1987: John Longmire:     Corowa Rutherglen
1988: Chris Naish:       Wangaratta
1989: Ben Doolan:        Albury
1990: Clinton Cole:          North Albury
1991: Damian Houlihan:   Corowa Rutherglen
1992: Adrian Whitehead:  Wodonga
1993: Trent Montgomery:      Wangaratta
1994: Matthew Fowler:        Albury
1995:
1996:
1997:
1998: David Willett:        Corowa Rutherglen
1999: Joshua Cross:         Albury
2000: Cory Brown:           Lavington
2001: Matthew Prendergast:  Lavington
2002: Andrew Carey:         Myrtleford
2003: Matthew Dwyer:        Wangaratta Rovers
2004: Daine Porter:         Wangaratta
2005: Mark Tyrell:          Yarrawonga
2006: Craig Lieschke:       Wodonga
2007: Jack Ziebell:     Wodonga
2008: Todd Bryant:          Wodonga Raiders
2009: Jared Worsteling:     Wodonga
2010: Luke McNeil:          Lavington
2011: Nico Sedgwick:        Lavington
2012: Hayden Filliponi:     Corowa Rutherglen
2013: Alex Marklew:         Wangaratta Rovers
2014: Josh Minogue:         North Albury
2015: Marcus Hargreaves:    Yarrawonga
2016: Brad Melville	     Wangaratta
2017: Joe Richards	         Wangaratta
2018: Darcy Chellew:        Myrtleford
2019: Ky Williamson         Wangaratta Rovers
2020: O&M in recess. COVID-19
2021: Josh Mathey:          Wodonga
2022: Isaac McGrath:        Albury

O&MFNL - Club Championships
The Clever E. Bunton Football Championships

From 1953 to 1972 total points were based on the most ladder points across the seniors and reserves grades of O&MFL football. Unsure what year this award was first given.

From 1973 onwards, this award is based on the most ladder points across all three grades of O&MFL football.

1964: Wangaratta
1965: Albury
1966: Wangaratta
1967: Wangaratta
1968: Myrtleford
1969: Wodonga
1970: Wodonga
1971: Benalla
1972: Benalla
1973: ?
1974:
1975: Wangaratta Rovers
1976: ?
1977: Wangaratta Rovers
1978: Wangaratta Rovers
1979: Wodonga
1980:
1981:
1982: Wodonga
1983: Albury
1984: Wangaratta Rovers
1985: Albury
1986: Wodonga
1987: Wodonga
1988: Wangaratta Rovers
1989: Wodonga
1990: Wodonga
1991: Wodonga
1992: Wodonga
1993: Wodonga
1994: Wodonga
1995: Albury
1996: Albury
1997: Wodonga Raiders
1998: Wodonga Raiders
1999: Albury
2000: Albury &
2000: Corowa Rutherglen
2001: Wangaratta Rovers
2002: Wangaratta Rovers
2003: Wodonga Raiders
2004: Wodonga
2005: Wodonga
2006: Wodonga &
2006: Wangaratta
2007: Wodonga
2008: Albury
2009: Albury
2010: Albury
2011: Albury
2012: Albury
2013: Albury
2014: Albury
2015: Albury
2016: Albury
2017: Albury
2018: Albury
2019: Albury
2020: O&M in recess. COVID-19
2021: Albury
2022: Wangaratta Rovers

League honour boards

Premierships

Records

Football: Seniors 
 Most flags in a row: 
 4, St. Patrick (1921, 1922, 1923, 1924).
 4, Wangaratta (1949, 1950, 1951, 1952).
 Most grand finals in a row: 
10: Albury: 2009, 2010, 2011, 2012, 2013, 2014, 2015, 2016, 2017, 2018.
 7: Wangaratta Rovers: 1970, 1971, 1972, (1973 - 3rd),  1974, 1975, 1976, 1977, 1978, 1979, 1980.(10 grand finals in 11 years)
5: Wangaratta: 1922, 1923, 1924, 1925, 1926.
(bold: premiership years)

2007 to 2020 season senior football ladders

O&MFL Representative Match Results
Senior Football

The first known representative match was in 1914 when a team from the Albury, Corowa and Howlong clubs (O&M - NSW) played against a team made of Lake Rovers, Mount Ophir and Rutherglen (O&M - Vic), with the Victorian side defeating NSW by two points on the Albury Sportsground, in the State of Origin match.

In 1958, the O&MFL picked two separate teams, with one team playing the Farrer Football League and the other team playing the Riverina Football League, with both games played on the weekend of the 4 and 5 July 1958.

Caltex had the naming rights of the Victorian Country Championships matches in the 1960's. The 16 league series would run over a two year period, with knock out matches in the first season, followed by semi finals and a grand final in the following season.

In 1974, the O&MFL were disaffiliated with the VCFL, when the O&MFL refused to accept an application from the Lavington Football Club to join the league and were not allowed to compete in the Victorian Country Championships in 1974. The VCFL Country Championships was put on hold from 1975 to 1977. The O&MFL were re-affiliated with VCFL in 1976.

In 1998, the VAFA defeated the O&MFL at Waverley Park to win the Smokefree Victorian Challenge match, as a curtain raiser to the AFL Ansett Cup Pre season grand final, then the O&MFL turned the tables on the VAFA the following year in the same challenge match at the same venue.

From 2004 to 2006 the championships were decided at a carnival round-robin competition at one venue over a single weekend, with each of the four sides playing the others in matches of two twenty-minute halves. The team on top of the ladder, after these three matches, were declared the winner. Leagues not represented in the top four pools of four participated in other inter-league matches organised by the VCFL.

In 2007, there was no statewide VCFL Championships, just a rivalry round was played between close by leagues, (with the O&MFL playing the GVFL), with the round robin format returning in 2008.

The O&M have gone onto win the first division of the Victorian Country Football League interleague championship fourteen times, the most recent victory being in 2009.

The O&MFL representative teams wears a gold guernsey, emblazoned with a monogram-style black "O&M" initials, with black shorts and black socks.\

VCFL League Rankings

In 2009 the VCFL decided to rank each country football league, with the O&MFL initially ranked number one.

The Metropolitan and Country Football Championships merged in 2016 to create a statewide competition, with the rankings reorganised to include metropolitan leagues in 2017.

The O&MFL were ranked number five in Victoria in the 2019 VCFL Country Championships.

As of 2020, AFL Victoria decided to scrap it's traditional interleague competition, but leagues could decide amongst themselves, if they wish to play or not.

2009 - 1
2010 - 3
2011 - 5
2012 - 5
2013 - 3
2014 - 5
2015 - 4
2016 - 5 
2017 - 6
2018 - 4
2019 - 5
2020 - AFL Victoria abandon the Victorian Country Football Championships. No interleague competition > COVID-19. 

The Ash Wilson Trophy

The Ovens & Murray Football League and the Goulburn Valley Football League have played for this trophy since 2001, to honour two long serving players - GVFL's Stephen Ash and OMFL's Mick Wilson, but the league's have been competing against each other in inter league football matches since 1930, when they first met at the Wangaratta Showgrounds, with the OMFL winning 17 and the GVFL winning 10 matches.

VCFL Championships

 VCFL Championships – Division One: 
 1954, 1955, 1957, 1967/68, 1985, 1987, 1996, 1997, 1998, 1999, 2001, 2006, 2008, 2009.
Runners Up
 1956, 1965/66, 1970, 1980, 2009.
Division Two Champions
1994
Highest Score by the O&MFL
 1971 - O&MFL: 30.15 - 195 v Farrer FL No.2 team: 12.8 - 80

Lowest Score by the O&MFL
 1970 - Hampden FL: 9.19 - 73 d O&MFL: 3.12 - 30 (VCFL grand final in Warrnambool.

Most O&M Rep games
 23: Mick Wilson (1990 - 2000)
Most Goals in a match
11 - Norm Minns: 1955 - O&M v Benalla Tungamah FL (VCFL semi final)
11 - Adam Prior: 2014 - O&M v Hampden FL
 9 - Terry Bartel: 1971 - O&M v Farrer FL

The Norm Minns Medal

Norm Minns - Born: 08/01/1925 Died: 29/12/1987.

Norm Minns was a former Wangaratta and O&MFL player and captain / coach of Benalla and Corowa. He was also a long time O&MFL selector and life member.

The Norm Minns Medal is awarded to the O&MFL best player in senior representative football and was first awarded in 1997.

1997 - Guy Rigoni - Myrtleford
1998 - Brett Kirk - North Albury
1999 - Tim Hargreaves - Yarrawonga
1999 - Travis McLean - Albury
2000 - Tim Hargreaves - Yarrawonga
2001 - Rod Skender - Myrtleford
2002 - Travis Hodgson - North Albury
2003 - Kade Stevens - Lavington
2004 - Jarrod Twitt - Wodonga
2005 - Peter Taylor - Wangaratta Rovers
2006 - Craig Ednie - Yarrawonga
2007 - Scott Oswald - Yarrawonga
2008 - Matt Prendergast - Lavington
2009 - David Clarke - Corowa Rutherglen
2010 - Matt Pendergast - Lavington
2011 - Michael Stevens - Yarrawonga
2012 - Judd Porter - Wangaratta
2013 - Jarrod Thompson - Yarrawonga
2014 - Joel Mackie - North Albury
2015 - Sam Carpenter - Corowa Rutherglen
2016 - Daniel Cross - Albury
2017 - Jono Spina - Lavington
2018 - Mark Whiley - Yarrawonga
2019 - Nathan Cooper - Wangaratta Rovers
2020 - O&MFL in recess. COVID-19
2021 - No rep football
2022 - Joe Richards

The Peter Johnston Medal

Peter Johnston was a former North Albury FC and O&MFNL official and life member of both organisations.

This medal is awarded to the best Under 18 O&MFNL footballer in representative matches.
2017 - Bailey Frauenfalder: Yarrawonga
2018 - Will Quirk: Myrtleford
2019 - Jake Bradshaw:
2020 - No interleague football > COVID-19
2021 - No interleague football > COVID-19
2022 - Josh Mathey - Wodonga

Ovens & Murray Hall of Fame
The Ovens & Murray Hall of Fame was established in 2005, to recognise and promote the outstanding achievements of some of the league's greatest players, dedicated administrators and club support staff and long serving media representatives.

As of the 2022 ceremony there have been 87 inductees, including three netballers.

Only six people have received the additional honour of being promoted to "Legend" status.
 
 2005 - Cleaver Bunton AO OBE  
 2007 - Rob Walker 
 2012 - Neville Hogan 
 2013 - Jim Sandral
 2017 - Stan Sargeant
 2022 - Martin Cross

O&MFNL Players / Stawell Gift Winners
The following O&MFNL footballers have won the prestigious Stawell Gift. The year below indicates what year each O&MFNL player won his Stawell Gift.

 1908 - Chris King - Rutherglen Football Club (1893)
 1928 - Lynch Cooper - Wangaratta Football Club
 1929 - Clarrie Hearn - Rutherglen Football Club (1893)
 1932 - Roy L. Barker - Yarrawonga Football Club
 1934 - Tom L. Roberts - Yarrawonga Football Club
 1952 - Lance Mann - Albury Football Club
 1954 - Jack Hayes - Rutherglen Football Club (1893)
 1986 - Glen Chapman - Albury Football Club

Stawell Gift - Hall of Fame Inductees
 Jack King - Rutherglen Football Club (1893)
 Greg O'Keeffe - Wangaratta Rovers Football Club. Father of Sean O'Keeffe.

Netball
History

The netball competition's were added to the Ovens & Murray Football League from the 1993 season, with A and B. Grade. The C. Grade competition was established in 1996, with the 17 and under competition commencing in 2012.

O&MFNL - Netball Best & Fairest Awards

A. Grade: Toni Wilson Medal
B. Grade:
C. Grade: 
17 & Under:

The Toni Wilson Medal is awarded for the best and fairest A-Grade netball player in the OMFNL during the home and away season. Wilson (the older sister of Mick Nolan) was the first President of the O&M Netball Association and instrumental in getting the netball competition formed in 1993.

Minor grades

Junior development
More successful has been the Murray Bushrangers TAC Cup Under 18s side, who play their home games in Wangaratta; prior to the AFL national draft and the inception of the TAC Cup, young players in the area would usually play through the grades with their local club, with less likelihood of being scouted by the recruitment staff from AFL clubs. Although there has been some concern from clubs about these players being removed from the local competition, the ones that do not get drafted usually return to their home clubs to play locally once they come of age.

Even in that case, there is some chance that a late-maturing "older" player in their early 20s will be drafted by an AFL club. Several notable examples to be drafted directly from the O&MFL include, Guy Rigoni (Myrtleford/Melbourne), Brett Kirk (North Albury/Sydney Swans) and Karl Norman.

All clubs field sides in the under 18s competition, aside from Myrtleford, which fields a joint team with the "Bright Football Club" wearing navy blue and gold colours & the club will be known as the "Alpine Eagles", and they would also field an under 18s joint team in the "Ovens & King Football League" also wearing navy blue and gold colours & the club will be known as the Alpine Eagles. However the Alpine Eagles alliance between Myrtleford and Bright had strained over the last few seasons before finally after the 2013 season The Myrtleford under-18s announced that they will stop wearing navy blue and gold colours of the "Alpine Eagles" and will be returning to the red, white and black colours & the club will be known as the "Myrtleford Saints", ending their almost 10-year partnership with Bright, in place since the early 2000s.

Albury Wodonga Junior Football League

Notes:  Team field by club for that age group; "=Yes" & "=No".

Wangaratta & District Junior Football League
 Wangaratta & District Junior Football League
The W&DJFL was established in 1938 and currently has three divisions of football in the Under 12's, Under 14's and Under 16's. All the Wangaratta based club's in the Wangaratta & District Junior Football League club's are independent incorporated local community sports club's and are not affiliated with any O&MFNL or O&KFNL clubs.

Some of the former W&DJFL players that went onto play VFL / AFL senior football were - John Brady, Lance Oswald, Ian Rowland, Sam Kekovich, Mick Nolan, Mark Browning, Dennis Carroll, Darren Steele, Chris Naish, Steve Johnson, Alipate Carlile, Ben Reid, Sam Reid and Jack Crisp.

AFLNEB Youth Girls League
 AFL North East Border Female Football League
The competition age group is from 12-17.

Notes:  Team field by club for that season; "=Yes" & "=No".

Premiers

 2015: Lavington 
 2016: Lavington 
 2017: Wodonga Raiders

See also
Ovens and Murray
Group 9 Rugby League
Murray Cup
AFL Victoria Country: Victorian Country Championships

References

External links
Official Facebook page
Country Footy Scores O&MFL page
1926 - An early history of the O&MFL
O&MFL Inter league match results: 1953 to 2010
VCFL History
 VCFL Interleague match results: 2009 to 2022
 A Brief History - Ovens & Murray Football League FOX SPORT PULSE
 Australian Rules Football Leagues Lists
 1923 - Corowa FC team photo
 1926 - O&MFL Grand Final photos. St. Patrick's FC & Wangaratta FC
 1928 - O&MFL Premiers: Albury FC team photo
 1928 - O&MFL Runners Up: St. Patrick's FC
 1929 - East Albury FC team photo
 1929 - East Albury FC team photo
 1931 - O&MFL Premiers: Weir United FC team photo
 1932 - Corowa FC & East Albury FC team photos
 1934 - Corowa FC & Albury FC team photos
 1937 - Corowa FC & Wangaratta FC team photos
 1939 O&MFL Premiers - Albury FC - team photo
 1944 - Border United FC & Rutherglen FC team photos
 1947 - Border United FC team photo
 1950 - Corowa FC team photo
 1953 - Corowa FC team photo
 1963 - O&MFL Runners Up: Corowa FC team photo
1926 - Wangaratta FC & St. Patrick's FC team photos (June, 1926)
1926 - Ovens & Murray FL Grand Final team photos: Wangaratta FC & St. Patrick's FC (September, 1926)
1929 - Wangaratta FC team photo
1930 - Wangaratta FC & East Albury FC team photos
1933 - Wangaratta FC & Border United FC team photo
1934 - Wangaratta FC & Rutherglen FC team photos
1937 - Wangaratta FC & Corowa FC team photos
1938 - Ovens & Murray FL Grand Final team photos: Wangaratta FC & Yarrawonga FC
1969 - O&MFL Grand Final Critic

 
Australian rules football competitions in New South Wales
Australian rules football competitions in Victoria (Australia)
Netball leagues in Victoria (Australia)
Netball leagues in New South Wales